Birkoor is a village in Nizamabad district in the state of Telangana in India. It has a population of  47,647 people.

References 

Villages in Nizamabad district